Straight Up Go-Go is a 1992 documentary film directed by Shuaib Muhammed Kedar and Shuaib Mitchell. The documentary was first broadcast on March 11, 1992 on WHUT-TV  (a PBS member public television, owned and operated by Howard University).

Synopsis

The directors analyze and theorize about the roots and historical impacts that influenced the development of go-go music. The documentary captures footage of go-go bands performing at various musical festival throughout the Washington metropolitan area (such as the "Georgia Avenue Festival", "F Street Festival", and music festivals at Anacostia Park and Wilmer's Park) and compares the rhythmic similarities to those found in West African music. It also traces many of the musical influences of Cab Calloway, James Brown, and Fela Kuti have added to the development of go-go culture.  Many of the prominent go-go bands and musical artist of the time period also provided their personal analysis and insight to the influences of go-go music and its culture.

Contributors

 Pleasure Band
 The Junkyard Band
 The Uptown Crew
 Rare Essence
 Leroy Fleming
 Nelson George
 Richard Harrington
 Cathy Hughes
 Maxx Kidd
 Jill Nelson
 Mamadi Nyasuma
 Salt-N-Pepa
 Charles Stephenson
 Experience Unlimited

See also
 Music of Washington, D.C.
 Go Go Live at the Capital Centre — 1987 go-go concert
 Good to Go — 1986 film

References

External links

1992 films
1992 television films
1992 documentary films
American documentary films
American independent films
Go-go
Culture of Washington, D.C.
Documentary films about African Americans
Documentary films about music and musicians
1990s English-language films
1990s American films